Ekk Deewana Tha (English: There was a Crazy Guy) is the soundtrack album, composed by A. R. Rahman to the 2012 Indian romantic drama film of the same name, written and directed by Gautham Vasudev Menon, featuring Prateik Babbar, Amy Jackson, in her Bollywood debut, and Manu Rishi in the lead roles. This film is a remake of Gautham Menon's own Tamil film, Vinnaithaandi Varuvaayaa or the Telugu film, Ye Maaya Chesave. The soundtrack album was released at Lawns of Taj Khema, eastern gate of The Taj Mahal, Agra, by A. R. Rahman on 21 December 2011.

Background 
A. R. Rahman has retained the same tunes from Vinnaithaandi Varuvaayaa and Ye Maaya Chesave. The soundtrack album consists of lyrics penned by Javed Akhtar, collaborating with Gautham Menon for the first time. Javed Akhtar replaced Thamarai from Vinnaithaandi Varuvaayaa and Anantha Sriram from Ye Maaya Chesave. Javed Akhtar had to be in Chennai, to supervise the script and writing the lyrics for the film. A source close to the development said, "Javed saab and Gautham hit it off well. The lyricist's inputs will be taken into consideration as Gautham is particular that his film should not come across as a routine South Indian remake."
Clinton Cerejo sings Phoolon Jaisi instead of Omana Penne.

Release 
The crew including A. R. Rahman and Javed Akhtar were set to perform live at Mehtab Bagh, which has a stunning backdrop in the Taj Mahal. However, the Archaeological Survey of India (ASI) later denied permission to the crew owing to the damages sustained while shooting for Mere Brother Ki Dulhan was going on at Mehtab Bagh. Then the music album was released at Lawns of Taj Khema, eastern gate of Taj Mahal, which has a good view of the Taj Mahal, on 21 December 2011. The audio CD hit the stores, all across the country, on 6 January 2012, under the label of Sony Music.

Track listing

Critical reception

The album received positive reviews from the critics. Glamsham stated "Ekk Deewana Tha is one of the finest A. R Rahman's works that delivers "deewangi" of music in all possible expressions that is conveyed through this eternal love saga" and rated 4 out of 5. The lyrics did face some criticism though, Music Aloud saying - "A soundtrack that will take much getting used to for people who are crazy about Vinnai Thaandi Varuvaaya, due mainly to Javed Akhtar." Musicperk.com rated the music album 8/10 quoting "If you are a first time listener, you will LOVE this! For those who are already in love with VTV and YMC songs, you should probably take the instrumentals and the first song alone".

Joginder Tuteja of Bollywood Hungama rated the album 3.5 out of 5 and stated "Ekk Deewana Tha is a very good album and a wholesome musical experience. Except for 'Kya Hai Mohabbat' (which ironically arrives at the very beginning of the album), rest of the album is fantastic and is a must-hear for those who swear by Rahman's score and also those who may not necessarily be bowled over by each and every work of this."

Atta Khan of Planet Bollywood rated the album 7/10  and stated "Vinnaithandi Varuvaayaa was an award-winning soundtrack that had fans thrilled in Southern India! And after hearing Ek Deewana Tha you can appreciate why the original Tamil version was such a big hit – songs like "Aromale", "Hosanna" and "Sharminda Hoon" sound refreshing even for the romantic genre!"

References 

2011 soundtrack albums
A. R. Rahman soundtracks
Hindi film soundtracks
Sony Music India soundtracks
Drama film soundtracks